Peggy Moran (born Mary Jeanette Moran, October 23, 1918 – October 24, 2002) was an American film actress who appeared in films between 1938 and 1943.

Early years
Born  in Clinton, Iowa, Moran was the daughter of Earl Moran, an artist who specialized in pin-ups for calendars and magazines. Her mother was a dancer before marriage, giving up her career for her family. She and her mother moved west after Moran's 1937 high school graduation.

Career 
Moran's film career began at Warner Bros. in the late 1930s. She starred in a number of B movies, including The Mummy's Hand (1940), Slightly Tempted (1940), Horror Island (1941), Treat 'Em Rough (1942), and King of the Cowboys (1943), and played smaller parts in A pictures, such as the "first cigarette girl" in Ninotchka (1939). After marrying director Henry Koster on October 30, 1942, a bust of Moran was featured in every picture her husband directed. After her marriage, Moran retired from acting and appeared in only one other film; a documentary made in 2000.

Personal life 
Koster and Moran had two sons. After Koster retired in 1966, the couple traveled extensively until his death in 1988.

Death 
On October 24, 2002, only one day after her 84th birthday, Moran died of complications from injuries she had suffered in a car accident on August 26, 2002. She was cremated and her ashes were scattered at sea.

Filmography

References

External links

Interview About The Mummy's Hand

Actresses from Iowa
American film actresses
People from Clinton, Iowa
1918 births
2002 deaths
20th-century American actresses
Road incident deaths in California